This table indicates major milestones in the Paralympic Movement, including the development of the Summer Paralympics, the Winter Paralympics, and the International Paralympic Committee.

References

Paralympic Games